Christian Parrish Takes the Gun, known professionally as  Supaman is an Apsáalooke rapper and ghost/thunder dancer who was born in Seattle, Washington and grew up in Crow Agency, Montana.

The child of parents who struggled with alcoholism, Supaman spent part of his childhood in foster care before being raised by his mother. He began DJing in the 90s after hearing a Litefoot song (with the two touring together in 1999), In the fourth grade, Christian began dancing at powwows. While in elementary school he began to write poetry and later began to rap. He related to rap music because he felt he was going through the same issues that most artists were rapping about. Taking the name 'Supaman' at the spur of the moment in a DJ competition, Supaman began rapping in a more original style until he had a spiritual encounter that told him to live a better lifestyle and rap about more meaningful and inspirational topics. In the spiritual encounter he had, Supaman said his creator " let [him] know [he] was to do everything on [his] own."

In 2003 Supaman founded the Native American hip-hop group Rezawrecktion, whose first album (It's Time) won a Native American Music Award in 2005. Since then, he has released four solo albums and received coverage and plaudits for the song Why? (featuring Acosia Red Elk). In his hit track, Prayer Loop Song, Supaman utilizes various instruments including the drum and the ute all while beatboxing, rapping, and remixing different Native tracks.  His reasoning for the song and video was an audition tape for America's Got Talent. Alongside rapping, he also tours schools, where he educates students about Native American history and culture. He performed live on MTV as part of a show featuring new artists. In 2013 his music and his fancy dancing skills were featured on a float for the Macy's Thanksgiving Day Parade. One thing Supaman is known for is performing his music while wearing his traditional fancy dance outfit. He started doing this by accident when he was forced to do his musical performance right after he had performed a fancy dance while at a show for a school. Supaman typically fuses spiritual concepts and ideas with his rap music. Supaman creates all of his albums by himself, doing everything from singing and writing the music to creating and designing the covers. Since releasing Gorilla in 2013 he has been featured on different songs and is set to release “Illuminatives” which features songs available from his viral videos.

Supaman is featured, with MAG7, in the Taboo video "Stand Up / Stand N Rock #NoDAPL" which won an award for MTV Video Music Award for Best Video with a Social Message in 2017.  He has also been nominated for and received multiple awards for his work as a DJ, singer, and rapper, and a fancy dancer including the Tuney Award which he won seven times, the Aboriginal Peoples Music Choice Award, and the North America Indigenous Music Award. Supaman was a contributor to the Standing Rock protest in which the Taboo song he is featured in is about. During the movement, Supaman visited Standing Rock frequently to perform and speak.

In 2018 Supaman released “Illuminatives” which features songs select songs from his viral videos.

Discography 
 It's Time (2005, with Rezawrecktion)
 Honest to God (2007)
 Crow Hop (2008)
 Deadly Penz (2009)
 Gorilla (2013)
 Illuminatives (2018)
 Medicine Bundle (2021)

References 

Crow people
Living people
Native American rappers
Native American dancers
21st-century American rappers
Year of birth missing (living people)